St Laurence's College (known colloquially as Lauries) is an independent Catholic primary and secondary school for boys, located in South Brisbane, Queensland, Australia. Founded by the Congregation of Christian Brothers in 1915. the school is a member of Edmund Rice Education Australia. As of 2021, the college had an enrolment of over 2,100 students from Year 5 to Year 12. St Laurence's is affiliated with the Associated Independent Colleges sporting association.

Some of the college's historic buildings are listed on the Brisbane Heritage Register.

History 
The college was officially opened and blessed on 11 July 1915 by the Archbishop of Brisbane James Duhig. The school has been operated by the Christian Brothers since its inception. On the first day there were 270 students and a staff of five teachers. The monastery for the Brothers was built in 1917.

Since 1961, the school has also operated sporting fields in the southern Brisbane suburb of Runcorn, which contains eight playing fields and a function centre. In 1977 the school established an outdoor educational facility, Camp Laurence, at Lake Moogerah, to the west of Brisbane.

In 1994 a College Board was established as an advisory group for the principal. In 1996 the first lay principal, Mr D Frederiksen, was appointed with the Christian Brothers retaining ownership and control of the College. The last of the brothers left the monastery in 2009, and the building was converted in 2010 into the school's administration building.

In 2010, as part of an agreement with the adjacent Mater Hospital Brisbane, the school's land was leased for 25 years to build a six-storey car park, which now houses the college's synthetic oval on top along with a 1500 seat auditorium.

Sport 
St Laurence's College is a member of the Associated Independent Colleges (AIC).

AIC premierships 
St Laurence's College has won the following AIC premierships.

 Australian Football (3) - 2019, 2020, 2021
 Basketball (2) - 2010, 2011
 Cricket (3) - 2008, 2017, 2021
 Cross Country (3) - 2003, 2004, 2019
 Rugby Union (6) - 1991, 2001, 2008, 2020, 2021, 2022
 Rugby League (1) - 2021
 Soccer (10) - 2001, 2002, 2006, 2007, 2012, 2013, 2015, 2018, 2019, 2021, 2022
 Tennis (1) - 2020
 Volleyball (3) - 2012, 2014, 2020

Notable alumni
Alumni of St Laurence's College are known as "Old Boys" and may elect to join the school's alumni association, the St Laurence's College Old Boys Association. Notable alumni include:

Business
 Peter O'Mearaformer CEO of the Western Force rugby union team
 John Symond founder of Aussie Home Loans

Entertainment, arts and the media
 Murray Foyactor and theatre director
 Gerard LeeAustralian novelist, screenwriter and director
 Kerry O'Brientelevision news journalist and presenter
 Conrad SewellAustralian singer-songwriter
 Ross Symondsa former news presenter for Seven Network in Sydney

Politics, law and public service
 Darryl Briskeyformer state Labor member for Cleveland
 Condon Byrneformer federal Labor Senator for Queensland
 Paul FinnJudge of the Federal Court of Australia

 Mike Horanformer state National member for Toowoomba South and Leader of the Opposition
 Dennis Ivesformer Public Service Commissioner 1990–1995
 Len Keoghformer federal Labor member for the Division of Bowman
 John Mickelformer state Labor member for Logan and Speaker of the Legislative Assembly of Queensland
 Jeffrey SpenderJudge of the Federal Court of Australia and Queen's Counsel

Sports
 John Anderson Olympic sailor; gold medalist at the 1972 Olympics
 Thomas AndersonOlympic sailor; gold medalist at the 1972 Olympics
 Neil Betts rugby union player for the Wallabies
 Brendan Cannonrugby union player for the Wallabies and Queensland Reds
 Mark Connorsrugby union player for the Wallabies and Queensland Reds
 Nev Cottrellrugby union player for the Wallabies and Queensland Reds
 Cooper Cronkrugby league player for Sydney Roosters, Queensland Maroons, and the Kangaroos
 Rhys Jacksrugby league player
 Rowan Crothers Paralympic swimmer
 Dan Crowleyrugby union player for the Wallabies and Queensland Reds
 Ken Fletchertennis player and winner of 12 Grand Slam titles
 Greg Hartung President of the Australian Paralympic Committee and Vice-President of the International Paralympic Committee
 Brian Harvey Paralympic athlete
 Ryley Jacksrugby league player for the Gold Coast Titans
 Damon KellyOlympic weightlifter and Commonwealth Games gold medalist
 Laurie Lawrencecoach of the Australian Olympic swimming team
 Luke McLeanrugby union player for Italy and Sale Sharks
 Andrew Mewingswimmer and medalist in the World Championships and Commonwealth Games
 Brendan O'ReillyUFC mixed martial artist
 Harry SharpAustralian rules football player
 Elliott ShrianeOlympic speed skater
 Joshua SlackOlympic beach volleyball player
 Archie SmithAustralian rules football player for the Brisbane Lions
 Mark StockwellOlympic swimming silver medalist at the 1984 Olympics; chairman of the Australian Sports Foundation
 William ZillmanProfessional rugby league player

Controversies

July 2008 attack on students 
On 28 July 2008, a group of youths armed with a meat cleaver and a steel bar stormed St Laurence's School campus in South Brisbane and attacked two 15-year-old boys. One student was slashed across the face and had to undergo surgery. Another suffered deep cuts to his lower back. Seven individuals, aged between thirteen and eighteen, were charged over the attacks.

Sexual assault 
The college has a history of sexual assaults. At a candlelight mass in 2015 hosted by Ian McDonald, St Laurence's previous principal, he apologised for the sexual assaults, saying that they "must never happen again". In April 1984, former Christian Brother Brian Dennis Cairns was charged with sexual assault offences against twelve male pupils, aged from ten to twelve years, a number of which attended St Laurence's. Cairns was jailed in 1985 and again in 2014 after more victims came forward.

See also 

 Catholic education in Australia
 List of schools in Queensland

References

External links
 
 St Laurence's Old Boys Association

Congregation of Christian Brothers secondary schools in Australia
Educational institutions established in 1915
Boys' schools in Queensland
Catholic primary schools in Brisbane
1915 establishments in Australia
Catholic secondary schools in Brisbane
Congregation of Christian Brothers primary schools in Australia
Brisbane Local Heritage Register
South Brisbane, Queensland